The 1940 Palestine Cup (HaGavia HaEretz-Israeli) was the eleventh season of Israeli Football Association's nationwide football cup competition. 

The defending holders, Hapoel Tel Aviv, fell to city rival Maccabi Tel Aviv at the semi-final. Maccabi met the emerging team of Beitar Tel Aviv at the final and lost 1–3.

Results

First round
Draw for the round was held in early January 1940. The 6 teams from the Tel Aviv division of the 1939 Palestine League were given a bye to the second round, along with Hapoel Haifa. Hapoel Ramat Gan also received a bye during the draw.

Replay

Second round

Quarter-finals

Semi-finals

Final

Notes

References
100 Years of Football 1906-2006, Elisha Shohat (Israel), 2006

External links
 Israel Football Association website 

Israel State Cup
Cup
Israel State Cup seasons